Mufti Gulab Khan is a Pakistani politician who was a Member of the Provincial Assembly of Balochistan, from May 2013 to May 2018.

Early life and education
He was born on 10 February 1982 in Zhob.

He graduated from Wafaq ul Madaris Al-Arabia and is a teacher by profession.

Political career

He was elected to the Provincial Assembly of Balochistan as a candidate of Jamiat Ulema-e Islam (F) from Constituency PB-18 Sherani / Zhob in 2013 Pakistani general election.

References

Living people
Balochistan MPAs 2013–2018
1982 births
Jamiat Ulema-e-Islam (F) politicians